The Lukang Wen Wu Temple is a Wen Wu temple in Lukang Township, Changhua County, Taiwan.

History
The temple was established in 1812.

Architecture

The temple area consists of Martial Temple (武廟), Literature Shrine (文祠) and Wenkai Academy (文開書院).

Transportation
The temple is accessible west of Huatan Station of Taiwan Railways.

See also
 List of tourist attractions in Taiwan

References

Taoist temples in Taiwan
Temples in Changhua County
1812 establishments in Taiwan
Religious buildings and structures completed in 1812